is a soccer stadium located in the Minato-ku area of Nagoya, Aichi, Japan.

External links

Football venues in Japan
Sports venues in Nagoya
Sports venues completed in 1993
1993 establishments in Japan